Kete Ioane (30 October 1950 – 13 February 2015) was a Cook Islands politician. He was a Cook Islands Democratic Party Member of Parliament from 1999 to 2010 and served as a cabinet minister between 2006 and 2009.

Biography
Ioane was born in Amuri on the island of Aitutaki. He attended Amuri and Araura Primary school and Aitutaki Junior High School.  He has a long career as a public servant, first in the Agriculture Department, later in the Police Department.  He was first elected to Parliament as member for Vaipae–Tautu in the 1999 elections.

From 1999 to 2005 Ioane served as party whip.  Shortly before the 2006 election he was appointed to Cabinet.  His appointment later became the subject of an electoral petition, as rival Cook Islands Party candidate George Pitt claimed it had been made solely to provide Ioane with extra campaign funds.  The petition was ultimately rejected, but Prime Minister Jim Marurai was criticised by the Chief Justice over the appointment.

Ioane held the portfolios of Minister for the Environment, Justice, and Parliamentary Services A reshuffle in July 2009 saw him removed as Environment Minister and given the Health portfolio. He resigned from Cabinet in December 2009 in protest at the sacking from Cabinet of Democratic Party leader Terepai Maoate.

Ioane failed to win re-election in the 2010 and 2014 general elections. He was selected as the Democratic Party's candidate for the 2015 by-election in the Vaipae-Tautu constituency, but died in Auckland on 13 February, just four days before the election.

References

1950 births
2015 deaths
Cook Island Māori people
Members of the Parliament of the Cook Islands
People from Aitutaki
Democratic Party (Cook Islands) politicians
Environment ministers of the Cook Islands
Justice ministers of the Cook Islands
Health ministers of the Cook Islands